Walcott Lake is one of several lakes in the Alph River system, this one located  east of the snout of Walcott Glacier on the Scott Coast. It was named by the New Zealand Geographic Board in 1994 in association with Walcott Glacier.

References

Lakes of Victoria Land
Scott Coast